René Michel Emile Joannes-Powell (11 February 1896 – 11 May 1940) was a Belgian hurdler. He competed in the 110 metres hurdles at the 1920 Summer Olympics and the 1928 Summer Olympics. In later life active as a sports journalist, he was killed as a spectator in the deliberate destruction of a bridge in Liège to stop the German invasion of Belgium during World War II.

References

External links
 

1896 births
1940 deaths
Athletes (track and field) at the 1920 Summer Olympics
Athletes (track and field) at the 1928 Summer Olympics
Belgian male hurdlers
Belgian male pole vaulters
Belgian decathletes
Olympic athletes of Belgium
Place of birth missing
Olympic decathletes
Belgian civilians killed in World War II